Dorothea Francis (1903 – 1975) was an Australian artist.

Biography 
A painter and illustrator, Francis studied under Miss Nankivell and Catherine Hardess in Melbourne. She later studied with her sister Margaret at the George Bell School. She exhibited with the Melbourne Society of Women Painters and Sculptors and the Melbourne Contemporary Artists winning a prize from the former in 1937. She showed alongside other female artists such as Lina Bryans and Isabel Tweddle. Francis illustrated an early Australian version of Alice in Wonderland in 1937. Her first solo exhibition was in Mornington in 1955. She did exhibit with the Victorian Artists Society in 1946 with Dora Serle and Alan Sumner. With her work "Composition" it was said it "weaves the figures of a woman, a child and a dog in a fruit-shop into a rhythmical design, carried out in patches of clear colour."

Francis has works in the collections of the State Library Victoria and the Heide Museum of Modern Art.

References

External links 
Dorothea Francis: Australian art and artists file, State Library Victoria
Sketchbook by Dorothea and Margaret Francis, State Library Victoria
Collection of 50 student drawings by Dorothea Francis, State Library Victoria

1903 births
1975 deaths
20th-century Australian women artists
20th-century Australian artists